Bhai Nirmal Singh Khalsa (12 April 1952 – 2 April 2020) was a Sikh Hazoori Ragi of Darbar Sahib in Amritsar, Punjab, India.

Early life and career
Bhai Nirmal Singh was born on 12 April 1952 at Jandwala Bhimeshah in Fazilka, Punjab. In 1976, he graduated with a Diploma in Gurmat Sangeet from Shaheed Missionary College, Amritsar. In 1977–78, he served as a music teacher at Gurmat College in Rishikesh and later taught at Shaheed Sikh Missionary College in Sri Ganganagar, Rajasthan. From 1979, he started serving as a Hazoori Ragi at Darbar Sahib. He had performed Kirtan at all five Takhts, various historical Gurdwaras across South Asia and throughout 71 countries. Bhai Sahib was a highly regarded ragi with knowledge of all 31 Raags of Guru Granth Sahib.

For services in the field of arts, Bhai Nirmal Singh Khalsa was awarded the Padma Shri, fourth highest civilian award in the Republic of India in 2009. He was the first Hazoori Ragi to receive this award.

Death
On 2 April 2020, Nirmal Singh Khalsa passed away due to cardiac arrest after testing positive for coronavirus disease 2019, at Guru Nanak Dev Hospital in Amritsar. His body was cremated at village Fatehgarh Shukarchak in Amritsar.

References 

1952 births
2020 deaths
Deaths from the COVID-19 pandemic in India
Indian Sikh religious leaders
Recipients of the Padma Shri in arts
People from Firozpur